Monkez Adi (Arabic:منقذ عدي) (born 22 January 1997) is a Qatari footballer. He currently plays as right back for Mesaimeer.

Career

Youth career
Monkez Adi started his career at Al-Gharafa and is a product of the Aspire Academy's youth system.

Eupen
On 8 July 2016, left Al-Gharafa and signed with Eupen on loan of the season.

Al-Gharafa
In 2017/2018 Season back To Al-Gharafa . On 15 July 2017, Monkez Adi made his professional debut for Al-Gharafa against Al-Ahli in the Pro League .

Personal life
Monkez Adi was born in the Qatari capital, Doha, to Syrian parents from the city of Hama.

External links

References

Living people
1997 births
Qatari footballers
Qatari expatriate footballers
Qatari people of Syrian descent
Naturalised citizens of Qatar
Qatar youth international footballers
Aspire Academy (Qatar) players
Al-Gharafa SC players
Umm Salal SC players
Mesaimeer SC players
Qatar Stars League players
Belgian Pro League players
Qatari Second Division players
Association football fullbacks
Expatriate footballers in Belgium
Qatari expatriate sportspeople in Belgium
Qatar under-20 international footballers